This is a list of electoral results for the electoral district of Gippsland North in Victorian state elections.

Members for Gippsland North
One member initially, two from 1877, One member again from 1889 when the new Electoral district of Gippsland Central was created.
</ref>

Election results

Elections in the 1950s

Elections in the 1940s

 Preferences were not distributed.

Elections in the 1930s

 Preferences were not distributed.

 Preferences were estimated.

Elections in the 1920s

 Two candidate preferred vote was estimated.

Elections in the 1910s

 Two party preferred vote was estimated.

References

Victoria (Australia) state electoral results by district